The Gaskiers glaciation is a period of widespread glacial deposits (e.g. diamictites) that lasted under 340 thousand years, between 579.63 ± 0.15 and 579.88 ± 0.44 million years ago — i.e. late in the Ediacaran Period — making it the last major glacial event of the Precambrian. It was also the last and the shortest of at least three major ice ages in the Neoproterozoic era. It is assumed that, in contrast to the Sturtian and Marinoan periods, it did not lead to global glaciation ("Snowball Earth").

Deposits attributed to the Gaskiers — assuming that they were all deposited at the same time — have been found on eight separate paleocontinents, in some cases occurring close to the equator (at a latitude of 10–30°). The 300 m-thick name-bearing section at Gaskiers (Newfoundland) is packed full of striated dropstones. Its  values are very low (pushing ), consistent with a period of environmental abnormality. The bed lies just below some of the oldest fossils of the Ediacaran biota, leading to early suggestions that the passing of the glaciation and the subsequent sharp rise in the ocean oxygen levels may have paved the way for the evolution of these odd organisms.  More accurate dating methods have shown that there is a 9 million year gap between the diamictites and the 570 Ma macrofossils.

The Bou-Azzer glaciation, an Ediacaran glaciation known from evidence collected from the West African Craton, may be equivalent to the Gaskiers glaciation. Alternatively, it has also been suggested to have been part of a glacial event later in the Ediacaran.

References

Ediacaran geology
Ice ages
Glaciology